International Display Technology (IDTech) was a partnership between Taiwan's Chi Mei Corporation and IBM Japan. Its manufacturing factory was sold to Sony in 2005. The headquarters was renamed to the current name, CMO Japan Co., Ltd. in 2006. It manufactured the IBM T220/T221 LCD monitors, among other products.

External links
 Official Website (site already down)
 SONY TO ACQUIRE IDTECH'S YASU LCD MANUFACTURING FACILITY Acquisition Will Serve As Second Manufacturing Base of Low-Temperature Polysilicon TFT LCD Display Panel for Mobile-Products
Electronics companies of Taiwan